Milan Radojičić (born 26 October 1970) is a former Serbian football player.

Radojičić played with Serbian clubs FK Zvezdara, FK Radnički Pirot and FK Železničar Lajkovac before joining FK Milicionar in 1999 and playing the 1999–2000 First League of FR Yugoslavia. Next he moved to Russia and played with FC Torpedo-ZIL Moscow.

References

1970 births
Living people
Serbian footballers
Serbia and Montenegro footballers
Association football forwards
FK Zvezdara players
FK Radnički Pirot players
FK Železničar Lajkovac players
FK Milicionar players
FC Moscow players
Russian Premier League players
Serbia and Montenegro expatriate footballers
Expatriate footballers in Russia